Zhang Xuelei (born 13 May 1963) is a Chinese former basketball player who competed in the 1988 Summer Olympics.

References

1963 births
Living people
Basketball players from Shenyang
Chinese men's basketball players
Olympic basketball players of China
Basketball players at the 1988 Summer Olympics
Chinese basketball coaches
Chinese expatriate basketball people
Chinese Taipei men's national basketball team coaches
LUCKIPar players
Chinese Basketball Alliance players